Bayanlucheh (also Romanized as Bayānlūcheh; also known as Bayānlūjeh) is a village in Sarajuy-ye Sharqi Rural District, Saraju District, Maragheh County, East Azerbaijan Province, Iran. At the 2006 census, its population was 399, in 59 families.

References

External links

Towns and villages in Maragheh County